John Ingleby (1749–1808) was a Welsh topographical artist who produced miniature watercolours for the antiquarian Thomas Pennant (1726–1798). He was born in Halkyn, Flintshire, to Hugh Ingleby and Ann Davies, where he lived for most of his life. The Inglebys originally came from Derbyshire to Flintshire where they worked the lead mines at Halkyn; four years after John Ingleby's death, the family went bankrupt.

When he died in 1808 at his home village, church records indicate that he worked as a "limner" – a craftsmen who worked on a small scale, who was well established.

Work
The collection of Ingleby watercolours established at the National Library of Wales are mostly views of North Wales. His best work involve little townscapes which are full of detail, and are valuable records of life at those towns and villages in the 18th – early 19th century. The colours are usually transparent, soft and even.

References

Artists in Wales by Paul Joyner; c.1740 – c.1851. Aberystwyth : National Library of Wales, 1997

1749 births
1808 deaths
Welsh male painters